Annie Levesque  (born ) is a Canadian retired female volleyball player, who played as a libero. She was part of the Canada women's national volleyball team.

She participated at the 2002 FIVB Volleyball Women's World Championship in Germany. 
On club level she played with Université de Sherbrooke.

Clubs
 Université de Sherbrooke (2002)

References

External links
https://www.usherbrooke.ca/volleyball/joindre-le-vert-or/direction-equipe-nationale/
http://www.rds.ca/universitaires/volleyball-sherbrooke-est-champion-1.264654

1979 births
Living people
Canadian women's volleyball players
Place of birth missing (living people)
Université de Sherbrooke alumni
Liberos